Simon Robertsson (born February 5, 2003) is a Swedish professional ice hockey winger for Skellefteå AIK of the Swedish Hockey League (SHL). Robertsson was drafted by the St. Louis Blues in the third round of the 2021 NHL Entry Draft with the 71st overall pick, after the Blues traded up to select him.

Personal life
Robertsson is the son of the former ice hockey player Bert Robertsson.

International play

Robertsson represented Sweden at the 2021 IIHF World U18 Championships and recorded three goals and one assist in seven games and won a bronze medal.

Career statistics

Regular season and playoffs

International

References

External links

2003 births
Living people
People from Piteå
Piteå HC players
Skellefteå AIK players
St. Louis Blues draft picks
Swedish ice hockey right wingers
Sportspeople from Norrbotten County